Yvon Rene Corriveau (born February 8, 1967) is a Canadian retired ice hockey left winger.

Corriveau was born in Welland, Ontario. Selected by the Washington Capitals in the 1985 NHL Entry Draft, Corriveau also played for the Hartford Whalers and San Jose Sharks.  He retired from active professional play in 2005. Yvon is now the head coach of multiple teams in the Connecticut Chiefs Hockey Organization.

Career statistics

References

External links
 
 Profile at hockeydraftcentral.com

1967 births
Living people
Berlin Capitals players
BSC Preussen Berlin players
Canadian ice hockey left wingers
Detroit Vipers players
Eisbären Berlin players
Hartford Whalers players
Minnesota Moose players
National Hockey League first-round draft picks
Sportspeople from Welland
San Jose Sharks players
Springfield Indians players
Toronto Marlboros players
Washington Capitals draft picks
Washington Capitals players
Ice hockey people from Ontario
Canadian expatriate ice hockey players in Germany